Jorvas railway station is a railway halt on the Helsinki Commuter Rail network located in the town of Kirkkonummi, Finland, between the Masala and Tolsa stations. The station is served by Helsinki Commuter Rail lines L, U and X. The train station has two staggered platforms. Westbound trains to Kirkkonummi use track one, while eastbound trains to Helsinki use track two.

Connections
 U-line trains (Helsinki-Kirkkonummi-Helsinki)
 L-Line trains (Helsinki-Kirkkonummi-Helsinki, nighttime)

References 

Railway stations in Uusimaa
Kirkkonummi